The Norris Penrose Event Center is a multi-purpose facility in Colorado Springs, Colorado, located at the base of Pikes Peak. It is home to the Pikes Peak or Bust Rodeo. It consists of an outdoor stadium, built in 1938 by Spencer Penrose, rancher and capitalist Jasper Ackerman, and mining partner Charles Leaming Tutt. The stadium was named after  Penrose following his death. The stadium seats up to 10,000 spectators and hosted a football game between the Los Angeles Bulldogs and the Pittsburgh Pirates. With five horse barns, an indoor arena built in 1986, and seating up to 500 spectators, the stadium was home to the Colorado Candoos of the National Indoor Football League.

History 
The Will Rogers Stadium was built on the west side of Cheyenne Lake in 1938. The Roundup began in 1920 as a combination rodeo with Native American dances and ceremonies. The stadium, site of concerts as well as home to the Colorado Springs Rodeo, was renamed the Penrose Stadium after the death of Spencer Penrose. Penrose Stadium was torn down in 1975–1976 to make way for Broadmoor West. Penrose Equestrian Center built in Bear Creek Regional Park was dedicated in 1974.

References

External links 
Official website

Indoor arenas in Colorado
Sports venues in Colorado Springs, Colorado
Event venues in Colorado
American football venues in Colorado
Sports venues completed in 1938
1938 establishments in Colorado
Rodeo venues in the United States